Xylobotryum is a genus of fungi in the Ascomycota phylum and in the order of Xylobotryales.

Species
As accepted by Species Fungorum;
 Xylobotryum andinum 
 Xylobotryum coralloides 
 Xylobotryum dussii 
 Xylobotryum portentosum 
 Xylobotryum rickii 

Former species; X. caespitosum  = Chaenothecopsis caespitosa

References

External links
Index Fungorum

Ascomycota